This was the twelfth season of Barnes Football Club.


FA Cup

Friendly matches

Notes

Barnes F.C. seasons
Barnes